Paul Robinson (born 22 November 1973) is a British former professional tennis player.

Tennis career
A left-handed player from Northampton, Robinson was active on the professional tour in the 1990s. He took a set off Greg Rusedski in his semi-final loss at the national championships in 1996 and also twice broke the serve of the Canadian-born player. His only ATP Tour main draw appearance came as a doubles qualifier at the 1996 Bournemouth International, with Arvind Parmar.

Robinson played collegiate tennis for Texas Christian University, where he was a three-time All-American in both singles and doubles. He represented Great Britain at the 1995 World Student Games and won a silver medal partnering Samantha Smith in the mixed doubles.

References

External links
 
 

1973 births
Living people
British male tennis players
English male tennis players
Tennis people from Northamptonshire
Sportspeople from Northampton
TCU Horned Frogs men's tennis players
Medalists at the 1995 Summer Universiade
Universiade medalists in tennis
Universiade silver medalists for Great Britain